The Cipher is a science fiction thriller podcast by Goldhawk Productions and BBC Sounds starring Anya Chalotra and Chance Perdomo.

Background 
The podcast debuted in late December 2020 and reached #1 on the iTunes' drama chart as well as #5 on the fiction chart. The podcast was recorded during the COVID-19 pandemic. The show was produced by Goldhawk Productions.  The show is on BBC Sounds and is available as a boxset. John Dryden, the director of Passenger List also directed The Cipher.  The show stars Anya Chalotra and Chance Perdomo. The show is a science fiction thriller podcast that follows the story of a protagonist named Sabrina. The podcast was a 2021 nominee for best scripted fiction podcast at the Webby Awards.

References 

Audio podcasts
2020 podcast debuts
2021 podcast endings
Thriller podcasts
Science fiction podcasts
Scripted podcasts
British podcasts